The Luisenstadt Canal, or Luisenstädtischer Kanal, is a  former canal in Berlin, Germany. It is named after the Luisenstadt district and ran through today's districts of Kreuzberg and Mitte, linking the Landwehr Canal with the Spree River, and serving a central canal basin known as the Engelbecken or Angel's Pool. The canal is named after Queen Louise, the wife of King Friedrich Wilhelm III.

The canal was designed by Peter Joseph Lenné based on earlier plans by Johann Carl Ludwig Schmid and was built between 1848 and 1852. Besides its water transport and land drainage and sewage roles, it was also conceived as a design element in the development of the surrounding area, and was designed as a decorative strip, flanked by quays lined with neoclassical buildings.

The canal never achieved significant boat traffic, and due to low flow levels its water became stagnant and severely nauseant, also due to the increasing quantity of water coming from sewage network. Between 1926 and 1932, the canal was partially filled in and transformed by the landscape gardener Erwin Barth into a sunken garden, with ground level at about the old water level. The Engelbecken was retained as an ornamental pool with the addition of fountains.

During and immediately after the Second World War, parts of the gardens were badly damaged, and sections of the sunken gardens in-filled with rubble. In 1961 the Berlin Wall was constructed along the northern part of the route of the former canal. Since 1991, many of the destroyed gardens have been reconstructed, and restored to the design of 1928.

See also
 Legiendamm
 Leuschnerdamm

References

Canals in Berlin
Buildings and structures in Friedrichshain-Kreuzberg
Buildings and structures in Mitte
Canals opened in 1852
1852 establishments in Prussia
1852 establishments in Germany